Mississippi Highway 67 (MS 67) is a state highway in Mississippi. MS 67 is located entirely within Harrison County.

Route description

MS 67 begins at the interchange between MS 15 and I-10 (Exit 46 A/B) in the city of D'Iberville, with the road continuing south across Biloxi Bay into Biloxi as I-110 (Exit 4 A/B). MS 15 and MS 67 head north, concurrent (overlapped) with each other, to have an interchange with both Sangani Boulevard and Promenade Parkway before crossing the Tchoutacabouffa River to leave D'Iberville and have an intersection with Lickskillet Road, which connects to Old Highway 67. MS 15 now splits off at a large trumpet interchange and MS 67 heads northwest through a mix of woodlands and subdivisions for the next several miles, where it rejoins the original MS 67 alignment, passes through the new planned community of Tradition, has an interchange with MS 605, and an intersection with Tradition Parkway. It is here where the highway passes  by the Tradition Campus of William Carey University, as well as the Bryant Center of Mississippi Gulf Coast Community College. Old Highway 67 splits off again (this time known as Success Road) to head north into the community of Success, while new MS 67 continues northwest through rural woodlands to cross Saucier Creek, as well as have an intersection with Bethel Road (Old Highway 67), before entering the community of Saucier and coming to an end at an interchange with US 49 at the northern end of town.

The entire length of Mississippi Highway 67 is a major, four-lane divided Expressway.

History

MS 55

What is now MS 67 was originally designated as Mississippi Highway 55 (MS 55) in 1932. This designation survived all the way to 1960, when it was decommissioned and renumbered to MS 67, to avoid confusion with the then new I-55.

Four-lane realignment
The current 4-lane expressway represents the third realignment of Highway 67 during its history.  Highway 67 previously existed as a 2-lane road, starting at I-10 Exit 41 south of Woolmarket, and proceeding north past the village of Success, before turning west to end at Highway 49 about a mile south of its present terminus.  

Prior to the opening of Interstate 10 in the 1970s, Highway 67 continued southeast from Woolmarket to intersect Highway 15 in D'Iberville, and the two routes crossed the now demolished bridge across the Biloxi Back Bay, and then following Caillavet Street to Highway 90, where both routes ended.  

The old Highway 67 was bypassed with a new 4-lane highway that now carries the Highway 67 designation from US-49 in Saucier to a new southern terminus at Highway 90 near downtown Biloxi.  Highway 15 joins Highway 67 north of Interstate 10 in D'Iberville, and both routes proceed south on the same alignment to their southern termini at the I-10/I-110 interchange.  The highway continues south into Biloxi as I-110.    

Construction on the Highway 67 relocation project began in 2002 and the road officially opened to traffic on January 16, 2009.  The entire project cost approximately $72 million.

Major intersections

References

External links

067
Transportation in Harrison County, Mississippi